Mia's Reading Adventure: The Bugaboo Bugs is the latest title of Mia's Big Adventure Collection software series created by Kutoka Interactive. Release in late 2007 in Canada and the United States, the game teaches reading to children between 5 and 9 years old.

Adventure
The Bugaboos have landed in Mia's quiet and peaceful house. Their partying and careless behaviour threatens to attract the attention of the Big Feet (humans) who have the power to drive everyone away from their homes. The player helps Mia handle the Bugaboo case.

Activities
The game's 12 educational activities teach associating images to words, adverbs, phonics, rhymes, spelling, sentence structure, vocabulary, reading comprehension, word recognition, etc.

Critical reception
The game received positive reviews from Macworld, Dr. Toy, The Opinionated Parent, Casual Gamer Chick, Geek Parenting, Props & Pans, Lille Punkin' Reviews and others. Common Sense Media gave it five stars.

Awards
The game received the Parents' Choice Gold Award for 2008 in the software category  and was part of Dr. Toy's 100 Best Children's Products for 2008.

References

External links
Mia's Reading Adventure at Kutoka.com

2007 video games
Mia series
Classic Mac OS games
Video games developed in Canada
Windows games
Children's educational video games
Video games about mice and rats